Dichomeris toxolyca is a moth in the family Gelechiidae. It was described by Edward Meyrick in 1934. It is found in Guangdong, China.

References

Moths described in 1934
toxolyca